Bánffytanya is the Hungarian name for two villages in Romania:

 Borşa-Cătun village, Borşa Commune, Cluj County
 Sărmăşel-Gară village, Sărmaşu Town, Mureș County